The 2014 Individual Speedway World Championship Grand Prix Qualification were a series of motorcycle speedway meetings used to determine the three riders who qualified for the 2014 Speedway Grand Prix. The final called the Grand Prix Challenge – took place on 24 August 2013, in Poole, Great Britain.

Qualifying rounds

Race-offs

Grand Prix Challenge 
24 August 2013
 Poole

Chris Harris qualified as Tomasz Gollob, who had been handed a wildcard, was forced to refuse due to sponsorship problems. His place then went to first qualified reserve who was 5th placed Harris as 4th placed Smolinski had already qualified due to Iversen qualifying as of right in the 2013 Speedway GP series.

See also 
 2013 Speedway Grand Prix

References 

2013 in speedway
2014 Speedway Grand Prix
Speedway Grand Prix Qualifications